The Southeastern Louisiana Lions and Lady Lions are composed of 14 teams representing Southeastern Louisiana University in intercollegiate athletics, competing in the NCAA Division I Football Championship Subdivision (FCS) and are members of the Southland Conference.

Sports sponsored

Baseball

The Southeastern Louisiana Lions baseball team represents Southeastern Louisiana University in Hammond, Louisiana. The team is a member of the Southland Conference, which is part of the NCAA Division I. The team plays its home games at Pat Kenelly Diamond at Alumni Field.

Men's basketball

The Southeastern Louisiana Lions basketball team represents Southeastern Louisiana University in Hammond, Louisiana. The school's team currently competes in the Southland Conference, which is part of the NCAA Division I. The team plays its home games at the University Center.

Women's basketball

The Southeastern Louisiana Lady Lions basketball team represents Southeastern Louisiana University in Hammond, Louisiana. The school's team currently competes in the Southland Conference, which is part of the NCAA Division I. The team plays its home games at the University Center.

Women's beach volleyball
The Southeastern Louisiana Lions women's beach volleyball team represents Southeastern Louisiana University in Division I women's beach volleyball in the Southland Conference. The team first played in spring 2020.

Football

The Southeastern Louisiana Lions football team represents Southeastern Louisiana University located in Hammond, Louisiana. The team competes in the Southland Conference, which is part of Division I FCS. The team plays its home games at Strawberry Stadium.

Softball

The Southeastern Louisiana Lady Lions softball team represents Southeastern Louisiana University located in Hammond, Louisiana. The team competes in the Southland Conference, which is part of the NCAA Division I. The team plays its home games at North Oak Park.

Traditions

"Lion Up!" cheer and gesture
In 2014 all Southeastern athletic teams adopted the Texas Tech University hand gesture and modified the related "Guns Up!" cheer to "Lion Up!" The gesture's "L" shape thus stands for "Lion" instead of the pistol it represents at Texas Tech.

See also
List of NCAA Division I institutions

References

External links
 

 
Sports teams in Hammond, Louisiana
Lion Up!